The Revenge of Shinobi is a video game for the Game Boy Advance, developed by 3d6 Games and published by THQ. It was released on November 19, 2002.

Although both games are related in title and follow the exploits of a ninja character, the Game Boy Advance game isn't a continuation or port of the Mega Drive/Genesis game of the same name.

Gameplay

The Revenge of Shinobis gameplay is that of a typical side-scroller. The player controls Shinobi, a ninja who is on a quest to stop a warlord named Ashira-o. Shinobi's main weapon is a katana, and he can also attack with shurikens. He later gains the abilities to double-jump and use dark magic and stealth moves. Most of the game's enemies are samurai and other ninja. There are five bosses throughout the game who control the other enemies.

Reception

The Revenge of Shinobi received mixed reviews according to the review aggregation website Metacritic. GameSpot writer Frank Provo focused on the monotonous, unchallenging nature of the gameplay. He also noted that although Shinobi has many abilities at his arsenal, there is not much need to use them. GameSpys Benjamin Turner echoed these points, also criticizing the password system and artificial intelligence. Minimal praise focused on the audio and graphics.

GameSpot named it the most disappointing Game Boy Advance game of 2002.

References

External links

2002 video games
Action video games
Game Boy Advance games
Game Boy Advance-only games
Platform games
Sega video games
Shinobi (series)
THQ games
Video games scored by Rod Abernethy
Video games set in Japan
Video games developed in the United States